Denis Clapton (born 12 October 1939) is an English former footballer who played in the Football League for Arsenal and Northampton Town. His brother Danny was also a professional footballer.

References

English footballers
English Football League players
1939 births
Living people
Arsenal F.C. players
Northampton Town F.C. players
Wisbech Town F.C. players
Association football forwards